This is a list of museums in Cologne, Germany:
 Museums of the City of Cologne – (K)
 The private museums – (P)
 Museum of the university – (U)

Museums

Art 
 Museum Ludwig – Modern art; e.g. pop art and Russian avant-garde (K)
 Wallraf-Richartz Museum – Paintings from medieval period to early twentieth century (K)
 Schnütgen Museum – Christian religious art mainly from medieval period (K)
 Museum für Angewandte Kunst – Museum of Applied Art (K) 
 Museum für Ostasiatische Kunst – Museum of East Asian Art (K) 
 artothek – (K)
 Kolumba – Art museum of the Archdiocese of Cologne (P)
 Domschatzkammer –  Treasure of the Cologne Cathedral (P)
 Kölnischer Kunstverein – (P)
 Käthe Kollwitz Museum – (P)
 Skulpturen Park Köln - (P)
 August Sander Archive - (P)

History and culture 
 EL-DE Haus – Nazism Documentation Centre located in the former headquarters of the Gestapo (K)
 Romano-Germanic Museum – Roman artifacts mainly from the Roman settlement Colonia Claudia Ara Agrippinensium (K)
 Kölnisches Stadtmuseum – History of the City of Cologne (K)
 Rautenstrauch-Joest Museum – Ethnology (K) 
  – Rhenish Photographic Archive (K)
 Fragrance museum – Farina House, History of Eau de Cologne and modern perfumery (P)
 Imhoff-Schokoladenmuseum – Imhoff Chocolate Museum (P)
  – (P)
  – (P)
 Deutsches Tanzarchiv Köln - German Dance Archive Cologne (P)

Science and nature 
  – Science center – (P)
 Geomuseum – Museum of Geology, palaeontology and mineralogy – (U)

References

External links 
 The museums of the City of Cologne 
 Museums in Cologne on Cologne-Tourism 

Cologne
 
Cologne
Museums